The  is a large gas field in Japan, east of Tokyo, in the Chiba prefecture.

Natural resources

Natural gas
The basin holds  the most prolific natural gas reserves in Japan, with ultimate gas production of 375 billion cubic meters.

Brine
In addition to natural gas, the field yields a brine rich in iodine. The iodine is extracted in large scale and makes this area the second largest producer after Chile, where the iodine is extracted from the caliche.

References

External links 
 Origin of dissolved natural gas and interstitial fossil seawater in the Minami-Kanto gas field
 Natural Gas Place

Natural gas fields in Japan
Geography of Chiba Prefecture